Laurie Halverson (born February 8, 1969) is an American politician who serves as County Commissioner for Dakota County in Minnesota. Previously, she has served as a member of the Minnesota House of Representatives from 2013 to 2021. A member of the Minnesota Democratic–Farmer–Labor Party (DFL), she represented District 51B in the southern Twin Cities metropolitan area.

Education
Halverson attended the College of St. Catherine, graduating in 2001 with a Bachelor of Science in political science. She later attended the Hubert H. Humphrey School of Public Affairs at the University of Minnesota.

Career
Halverson was first elected to the Minnesota House of Representatives in 2012. She won reelection against Republican Pat Hammond in 2016.

She supported the bill legalizing same-sex marriage in Minnesota.

Personal life
Halverson and her husband, Jason, have one child and reside in Eagan, Minnesota. Her grandfather, Howard I. Nelson, and her uncle, Peter C. Nelson, also served in the Minnesota Legislature.

References

External links

Rep. Laurie Halverson official Minnesota House of Representatives website
Rep. Laurie Halverson official campaign website
 "Ballotpedia link"

1969 births
21st-century American politicians
21st-century American women politicians
Humphrey School of Public Affairs alumni
Living people
Democratic Party members of the Minnesota House of Representatives
People from Eagan, Minnesota
St. Catherine University alumni
Women state legislators in Minnesota